The 2012 World Indoor Target Archery Championships was the 11th edition of the World Indoor Archery Championships. The event was held in Las Vegas, United States from February 5 to February 9, 2012 and was organized by International Archery Federation (FITA). The event was contested at the South Point Hotel, and the event was followed by the World Archery Festival and the finals of the second Indoor Archery World Cup.

Events

Recurve

Senior

Junior

Compound

Senior

Junior

Medal table

Participating nations
36 nations registered 269 athletes across disciplines, one fewer country and 69 athletes fewer than in Rzeszów in 2009.

  (8)
  (4)
  (3)
  (2)
  (18)
  (6)
  (2)
  (11)
  (1)
  (6)
  (9)
  (3)
  (4) 
  (8)
  (1)
  (1)
  (4)
  (19)
  (7)
  (24)
  (2)
  (9)
  (2)
  (9)
  (23)
  (2)
  (2)
  (4)
  (11)
  (1)
  (5)
  (6)
  (9)
  (17)
  (24)
  (2)

References

World Championship
A
2012
World Indoor Archery
World Indoor Archery Championships 2012